Ignacio José Herrera Fernández (born 14 October 1987) is a Chilean footballer who plays for Barnechea in the Primera B de Chile.

Club career
On 4 August 2015, it was reported that he joined Deportes Iquique.

On 29 February 2016, Herrera signed for Kazakhstan Premier League side Irtysh Pavlodar.

On 3 January 2017, Herrera signed for Azerbaijan Premier League side Neftchi Baku. On 23 April 2017, Herrera scored for Neftchi in a 3–2 defeat to Zira, only for the game to be awarded as a 3–0 victory to Zira two days later after Neftchi Baku fielded 7 foreign players in the match. In October 2017, Herrera extended his contract with Neftchi Baku for another six-months, until the end of the 2017–18 season. During the 2017–18 season Herrera scored 8 goals for Neftchi and became the top goalscorer of the team in the season.

On 29 June 2018, Herrera signed for K League 2 side Seoul E-Land.

In September 2021, he joined Lamezia Terme in the Italian Serie D.

Career statistics

Club

References

External links
 
 

1987 births
Living people
Footballers from Santiago
Chilean footballers
Chilean expatriate footballers
Chilean Primera División players
Primera B de Chile players
Segunda División B players
Kazakhstan Premier League players
Azerbaijan Premier League players
K League 2 players
Ecuadorian Serie A players
Serie D players
Rangers de Talca footballers
Betis Deportivo Balompié footballers
C.D. Huachipato footballers
Deportes Magallanes footballers
Magallanes footballers
Cobreloa footballers
Deportes Iquique footballers
FC Irtysh Pavlodar players
Neftçi PFK players
Seoul E-Land FC players
Club Deportivo Palestino footballers
Mushuc Runa S.C. footballers
S.D. Aucas footballers
F.C. Lamezia Terme players
A.C. Barnechea footballers
Association football forwards
Chilean expatriate sportspeople in Spain
Chilean expatriate sportspeople in Kazakhstan
Chilean expatriate sportspeople in Azerbaijan
Chilean expatriate sportspeople in South Korea
Chilean expatriate sportspeople in Ecuador
Chilean expatriate sportspeople in Italy
Expatriate footballers in Spain
Expatriate footballers in Kazakhstan
Expatriate footballers in Azerbaijan
Expatriate footballers in South Korea
Expatriate footballers in Ecuador
Expatriate footballers in Italy